Eugenia Yuvashevna Davitashvili, known as Djuna or Dzhuna (Georgian: ევგენია ჯუნა დავითაშვილი; Russian: Евге́ния Юва́шевна Давиташви́ли; née Sardis; 22 July 1949 – 8 June 2015) was a Russian faith healer, writer, painter and public figure of Iranian Assyrian descent who positioned herself as a healer, claiming the power to cure cancer, knit broken bodies, and prolong life beyond 100 years. She took her Georgian surname from her former husband.

Politics
In 1995, she participated in the Russian legislative election at the head of the Juna Davitashvili Bloc. Her 0.47% of votes were not enough to give her any seat in the State Duma.

Experiments
In 1983 and 1984, physicist and psi researcher, Russell Targ, his daughter Elisabeth Targ, and Keith Harary visited the Soviet Union as guests of the Soviet Academy of Sciences. In Moscow they were able to discuss remote viewing research with Russian scientists, visit psychics, including Davitashvili, and allegedly even carry out with her some remote viewing experiments between Moscow and San Francisco.

Death
Davitashvili died in Moscow on 8 June 2015, two days after she fell into a coma, according to her close friend and actor Stanislav Sadalsky. She was buried next to her son, who died in 2001.

See also
Baba Vanga

References

External links

1949 births
2015 deaths
People from Kurganinsky District
Russian psychics
Faith healers
Russian people of Assyrian descent
Soviet psychics